A deposit insurance national bank (DINB) is a temporary bank in the United States that is established by the Federal Deposit Insurance Corporation (FDIC) in the wake of a bank failure under the Banking Acts of 1933 and 1935.

Characteristics 
DINBs are chartered by the Office of the Comptroller of the Currency.  Upon creation, the bank assumes the failed bank's insured deposits and temporarily provides banking services to customers.  A DINB's powers are narrowly limited to servicing the insured deposits of a failed bank; it cannot acquire assets from the failed bank, as a bridge bank can, nor can it accept uninsured deposits, unless it is the only depository institution in its community.

The bank is managed by an executive officer appointed by the FDIC. A DINB is not required to have paid-in capital stock, has no board of directors, and is not required to own stock in a Federal Reserve Bank. Otherwise it conforms to the National Bank Act and other laws relevant to national banks.

A DINB can operate for up to two years. It can be acquired by another bank in its community, raise capital to become a permanent bank, or wind down and transfer its obligations to the FDIC.

History 

DINBs were initially the only way that the FDIC could resolve a failed institution. The first DINB was the Deposit Insurance National Bank of East Peoria, created when Fond Du Lac State Bank was closed by Illinois regulators on May 26, 1934. Under this original deposit insurance system, the FDIC assumed receivership of nine insured banks and paid off their deposits through DINBs.

After the Banking Act of 1935 permitted the FDIC to pay out depositors without establishing a DINB, use of this resolution method largely ceased, except for cases where a bank failed in an area with only limited banking services or where a prompt pay-out was not possible. For example, 1975 saw failures of Swope Parkway National Bank, a Black-owned business serving the local Black community, and The Peoples Bank of the Virgin Islands, which was the only locally-owned institution in the U.S. Virgin Islands; a DINB was created for each in hopes of giving the community time to establish a replacement institution. Only five DINBs were created by the FDIC between 1935 and 1998.

Initially, the FDIC responded to the 2023 collapse of Silicon Valley Bank by forming a Deposit Insurance National Bank of Santa Clara because no institution was immediately willing to assume its substantial uninsured deposits. After the Treasury granted an exception to cover the uninsured deposits, the DINB was replaced with a bridge bank named Silicon Valley Bridge Bank, N.A.

List of deposit insurance national banks

See also 
 Bridge bank#United States

Notes

References 
 Citations

 Sources

 
 

Federal Deposit Insurance Corporation
Bank failures in the United States